This Is Billy Mitchell is an album by saxophonist Billy Mitchell, released in 1962 on Smash Records.

Reception 

The Allmusic review by Scott Yanow stated "Although the tenor saxophonist is in typically fine form on six obscurities and two standards, this record's main significance is that it features the young vibraphonist Bobby Hutcherson, who was virtually at the beginning of his career. ... Mainstream hard bop of the era".

Track listing 
 "J & B" (Billy Mitchell) – 4:14
 "Sophisticated Lady" (Duke Ellington, Irving Mills, Mitchell Parish) – 3:25
 "You Turned the Tables on Me" (Louis Alter, Sidney Mitchell) – 5:41
 "Passionova" (John Hines) – 4:47
 "Tamra" (Billy Wallace) – 3:53
 "Automation" (Dave Burns) – 6:48
 "Just Waiting" (Melba Liston) – 2:46
 "Siam" (Gene Kee) – 5:27

Personnel 
Billy Mitchell – tenor saxophone
Dave Burns – trumpet (tracks 3–6 & 8)
Bobby Hutcherson – vibraphone
Clarence "Sleepy" Anderson – organ (tracks 1, 2 & 7)
Billy Wallace – piano (tracks 3–6 & 8)
Herman Wright – bass
Otis "Candy" Finch – drums

References 

1962 albums
Billy Mitchell (jazz musician) albums
Smash Records albums
Instrumental albums